HMS Zealous was a 74-gun third-rate ship of the line of the Royal Navy, built by Barnard of Deptford and launched on 25 June 1785.

She served in a number of battles of the French Revolutionary Wars and the Napoleonic Wars, notably the Battle of the Nile, where she engaged the French ship , helping to force her surrender. She was later cruising off Cadiz in 1801. She missed out on the Battle of Trafalgar, having been dispatched to Gibraltar for resupply.

After Trafalgar, Zealous continued in the blockade of Cadiz. On 25 November 1805,  detained the Ragusan ship Nemesis, which was sailing from Isle de France to Leghorn, Italy, with a cargo of spice, indigo dye, and other goods. Zealous shared the prize money with ten other British warships.

Zealous was later assigned to convoy duty in the Mediterranean.

Fate
After 31 years of service she was broken up in December 1816.

Notes

References

 
 Lavery, Brian (2003) The Ship of the Line - Volume 1: The development of the battlefleet 1650-1850. Conway Maritime Press. .

 

Ships of the line of the Royal Navy
Arrogant-class ships of the line
1785 ships